The Artist's Dilemma is a 1901 silent, fantasy film. It was filmed in New York City, New York, USA.  It is short film running two minutes.  It features an artist asleep in his studio and his dream of a clock opening and a beautiful woman coming out of it.

See also
 List of American films of 1901
Edison Studios

External links

1901 films
American silent short films
American black-and-white films
American fantasy films
Films directed by Edwin S. Porter
1900s fantasy films
Articles containing video clips
Films shot in New York City
1900s American films